Tom Modrak was an American football executive who was the general manager for the Philadelphia Eagles from May 1998 until his dismissal in May 2001, and was most recently the Vice President of College Scouting for the Buffalo Bills from 2001 before being relieved of duties on May 4, 2011. Before Philadelphia, he was in charge of scouting for the Pittsburgh Steelers. He was elected to the Pittsburgh Pro Football Hall of Fame in 2014.

Modrak died on April 11, 2017 at the age of 74.

References

1940s births
2017 deaths
Buffalo Bills executives
Philadelphia Eagles executives
Pittsburgh Steelers executives
National Football League general managers
Neurological disease deaths in Florida